Shirley Johnson (December 14, 1937 – January 14, 2021) was a Michigan legislator.

Early life
Johnson was born on December 14, 1937.

Education
Johnson attended Oakland Community College and Wayne State University, and graduated from Michigan State University.

Career
On November 4, 1980, Johnson was elected to the Michigan House of Representatives where she represented the 68th district from January 14, 1981, to 1992. On November 3, 1992, Johnson was again elected to the Michigan House of Representatives where she represented the 41st district from January 13, 1993, to 1998. On March 16, 1999, Johnson was elected to the Michigan Senate in a special election after the resignation of Mike Bouchard. In the state senate, she represented the 13th district and served from March 23, 1999, to 2004. Johnson left the Republican Party after leaving the Michigan Legislature.

Personal life
Johnson married Cliff in 1957. Together they had two children. Johnson was a Presbyterian.

References

1937 births
2021 deaths
Presbyterians from Michigan
Michigan Independents
Michigan Republicans
Women state legislators in Michigan
Michigan state senators
Oakland Community College alumni
Wayne State University alumni
Michigan State University alumni
Members of the Michigan House of Representatives
20th-century American women politicians
20th-century American politicians
21st-century American women politicians
21st-century American politicians